Tilasite is an arsenate mineral gemstone, with the elemental formula CaMg(AsO4)F. It prefers the monoclinic form of crystal, and has Mohs hardness of 5. It was named in 1895 by Hjalmar Sjögren in honor of Daniel Tilas, who was once director of mines for Sweden, and a regional governor for Västmanland. It was first discovered in Langban, Varmland.

In 1972, Bladh et al. characterised samples found near Bisbee, Arizona.

In 1994, Bermanec discovered centro-symmetric Tilasite near Nezhilovo, North Macedonia.

References

Fluorine minerals
Arsenic minerals
Magnesium minerals